Joseph Aloysius Melley (March 1, 1902 – October 28, 1983) was a Massachusetts attorney and politician who served as the thirty ninth Mayor of Chelsea, Massachusetts, USA, and in both houses of the Massachusetts legislature.

See also
 Massachusetts legislature: 1937–1938, 1939, 1947–1948, 1949–1950

References

Notes

1902 births
1983 deaths
Massachusetts state senators
Boston College High School alumni
Boston College alumni
Boston University School of Law alumni
Mayors of Chelsea, Massachusetts
Members of the Massachusetts House of Representatives
Lawyers from Chelsea, Massachusetts
20th-century American politicians
20th-century American lawyers